Adrian Hajdari (born 31 May 2000) is a Macedonian professional footballer who plays as a defender for Rapid Wien II in Austria.

Professional career
Hajdari made his professional debut with Rapid Wien in a 2-2 Austrian Football Bundesliga tie with FK Austria Wien on 8 December 2019.

International career
Born in Macedonia, Hajdari is of Albanian descent. He moved to Austria at a young age, and originally represented Macedonia internationally. He made one appearance for the Austria U18s in 2018, before switching back to represent the Macedonia U19s.

References

External links
 
 OEFB Profile

2000 births
Albanians in North Macedonia
Austrian people of Macedonian descent
Austrian people of Albanian descent
Macedonian emigrants to Austria
Living people
People from Gostivar
Macedonian footballers
North Macedonia youth international footballers
North Macedonia under-21 international footballers
Austrian footballers
Austria youth international footballers
SK Rapid Wien players
Austrian Football Bundesliga players
2. Liga (Austria) players
Association football defenders
Austrian Regionalliga players